Iman is a given name found in many cultures, that can be both masculine and feminine. Variations of spelling include Eman and Imaan. 

People with this name include:
 Iman (model) (born 1955), Somali fashion model, actress and entrepreneur
 Iman (singer) (born 1980), American singer-songwriter
 Eman Ahmed Abd El Aty (1980–2017), second heaviest woman ever recorded
Iman Abuzeid, Sudanese-American healthcare entrepreneur
 Iman Afsarian (born 1974), Iranian painter
 Iman Alami (born 1968), Iranian footballer
 Iman Ali (born 1980), Pakistani actress, model and singer
 Iman Aminlari (born 1979), Iranian architect
 Imman Annachi (born 1968), Tamil film actor and television presenter
 Iman al-Asadi (born 1964), Iraqi politician
 Eman El-Asy (born 1985), Egyptian actress
 Iman Barlow (born 1993), English kickboxer and muay thai fighter
 Iman Basafa (born 1992), Iranian footballer
 Iman Benson (born 2000), American actress
 Iman Chakraborty (born 1989), Indian singer
 Iman Crosson (born 1982), American actor and YouTube personality
 Iman Dozy (1887–1957), Dutch footballer
 Iman Elman (born 1992), Somali-Canadian military officer
 Iman Willem Falck (1736–1785), Dutch colonial governor
 Eman Fiala (1899–1970), Czech actor and composer
 Eman Gaber (born 1989), Egyptian fencer
 Eman El Gammal, Egyptian fencer
 Eman Al-Ghamidi, Saudi politician
 Eman Ghoneim, Egyptian-American geologist
 Imaan Hadchiti, Lebanese-Australian comedian and actor
 Iman Hakim (born 2002), Singaporean footballer
 Iman Budi Hernandi (born 1993), Indonesian footballer
 Iman Heydari (born 1983), Iranian footballer
 Iman Darweesh Al Hams (1991–2004), Palestinian schoolgirl killed in the Gaza Strip
 Iman Humaydan Younes (born 1956), Lebanese writer and researcher
 Iman Issa (born 1979), Egyptian artist
 Iman Jamali (born 1991), Iranian-Hungarian footballer
 Iman Essa Jasim (born 1997), Bahraini sprinter
 Eman Kellam (born 1997), English actor and YouTuber
 Imane Khalifeh (1955–1995), Iranian educator and peace activist
 Iman Khatib-Yasin (born 1964), Israeli social worker and politician
 Iman Kiani (born 1988), Iranian footballer
 Eman Lam (born 1982), Hong Kong singer-songwriter
 Eman Lam (dancer), Hong Kong dancer, singer, comedian and painter
 Iman Maleki (born 1976), Iranian painter
 Eman Markovic (born 1999), Norwegian footballer
 Iman Marshall (born 1997), American football player
 Iman Mersal (born 1966), Egyptian poet
 Iman Meskini (born 1997), Norwegian actress
 Iman Mobali (born 1982), Iranian footballer and coach
 Iman Mousavi (born 1989), Iranian footballer
 Iman Mutlaq, Jordanian businesswoman and activist
 Eman al-Nafjan, Saudi Arabian blogger and activist
 Eman El-Nossiry (born 1987), Egyptian volleyball player
 Iman al-Obeidi, Libyan law student
 Iman Perez (born 1999), French model and actress
 Iman al-Qahtani, Saudi Arabian journalist and activist
 Iman Razaghirad (born 1978), Iranian footballer
 Iman Rezai (born 1981), Iranian artist
 Iman Hasan Al-Rufaye (born 1982), Iraqi chess player
 Iman Sadeghi (born 1992), Iranian footballer
 Iman Salimi (born 1996), Iranian footballer
 Iman Budhi Santosa (born 1948), Indonesian writer and poet
 Iman Al Sayed (born 1984), Palestinian artist
 Iman Shahoud (born 1963), Syrian judge and activist
 Eman Sharobeem, Egyptian-Australian women's right activist
 Iman Shirazi (born 1992), Iranian footballer
 Iman Shumpert (born 1990), American basketball player
 Eman Suleman (born 1992), Pakistani model and actress
 Iman Xin Chemjong (1904–1975), Limbu historian
 Princess Iman bint Al Abdullah (born 1996), Jordanian royal, daughter and second child of King Abdullah II and Queen Rania
 Princess Iman bint Al Hussein (born 1983), Jordanian royal, daughter of King Hussein and Queen Noor
 Iman Vellani (born 2002), Canadian actress
 Iman Verjee, Kenyan author
 Iman Yehia (born 1954), Egyptian physician and writer
 Eman Al Yousuf (born 1987), Emirati writer and chemical engineer
 Iman Zakizadeh (born 1996), Iranian footballer
 Iman Zandi (born 1981), Iranian basketball player

See also 
 Iman
 Iman (surname)

Feminine given names
Iranian masculine given names